Secularism in Israel shows how matters of religion and how matters of state are related within Israel. Secularism is defined as an indifference to, rejection, or exclusion of religion and religious consideration. In Israel, this applies to the entirely secular community that identifies with no religion and the secular community within the Jewish community. When Israel was established as a new state in 1948, a new and different Jewish identity formed for the newly created Israeli population. This population was defined by the Israeli culture and Hebrew language, their experience with the Holocaust, and the need to band together against conflict with hostile neighbors in the Middle East.

History
Since 1922, many official documents originating in the land of Israel gave rise to religious freedom. In 1922, the Palestinian Mandate prohibited discrimination based on religious affiliation. In 1948, at the establishment of the state of Israel, the Declaration of Independence protected freedom of religion. The Declaration of the Establishment of the State of Israel was approved by members of the Jewish community of Palestine and the Zionist movement. The document's first section sheds light on the relationship between the Jewish people and the Land of Israel. It reads: "The Land of Israel was the birthplace of the Jewish people. Here, their spiritual, religious, and political identity was shaped." The history of the Jews establishing the State of Israel is long. The right of the Jewish people to settle in the land was recognized in the Balfour Declaration. The United Nations General Assembly passed the resolution that called for a Jewish state to be established in Eretz Israel on November 29, 1947.

Separation of religion and state
When he first proposed his ideas of political Zionism, Theodor Herzl was expecting the future Jewish state to be a secular state, in the style of central European countries of the time, such as Germany and Austria. However, Zionist and eventually Israeli politics were firmly coalition-based. When David Ben-Gurion became the first prime minister of Israel, although he was the head of the large Socialist party, he formed a government that included the religious Jewish Parties, and took a moderate line in forming the relationship between the state and the religious institutions, at the same time continuing their status as state organs.
Some secular Israelis feel constrained by the strict religious sanctions imposed on them. Many businesses close on Shabbat, including EL AL, Israel's leading airline, along with many forms of public transportation, and restaurants.

Policies controlled by religious leaders
In order to be formally married in Israel, a Jewish couple has to be married by an Orthodox rabbi. This also applies when and if a couple would like to divorce - they must seek out rabbinical council. Since some secular Israelis do not like this rule, they sometimes go abroad to be married, usually in Cyprus. Marriages officiated abroad are recognized as official marriages in Israel.
Also, all food at army bases and in cafeterias of government/state buildings has to be kosher.

Religious influences in politics
Many religious symbols have found their way into Israeli national symbols. For example, the flag of the country is similar to a tallit, or prayer shawl, with its blue stripes. The national coat of arms displays the menorah. The Israeli national anthem includes references of religion. "As long as the Jewish spirit is yearning" and "the two-thousand-year-old hope" are both lines in the anthem, "HaTikvah" ("The Hope"). (HaTikvah was sung at Jewish prayer services for many years prior to the 1948 UN partition that allowed for the reestablishment of Israel as a nation state.)

According to many people, due to the massive role of religion in government and politics, Israel cannot be considered a secular state in the common sense of the word.

Location
In Israel, the secularism of population centers varies. Tel Aviv, for example, is considered more secular; it is very cosmopolitan, with modern hotels, boutiques, coffee shops, and events with loud music. Non-Jews and secular Jews alike feel comfortable in this city because of the lack of religious bearing. Tel Aviv is a modern city similar to a coastal city in the United States like Miami, and is considered one of the top party cities in the world. It is typical to find bars and night clubs open until dawn, even on Shabbat. Conversely, Jerusalem is a very religious, conservative city, with a large Orthodox Jewish (Religious Zionists, as well as Ultra-Orthodox) population.

Differences in the Jewish population
Secular Jews make up 41.4% of the Jewish population, followed by the Traditional Jews accounting for 38.5% of the population, with the remaining 20% populated by the Orthodox and ultra-Orthodox. In Israel, the Reform and Conservative movements are estimated to make up 7.6% of the Jewish population, a significantly lower rate than in the Jewish diaspora.

Secular
Secular Jews in Israel identify as being Jewish because they celebrate Jewish holidays and value the religion, and speak Hebrew. This part of the population makes up 41.4% of the Jewish population. Secular Jews are largely supporters of the Israeli Labor Party and a Secular Zionist state. Secular Israelis identify as Jewish, but the religion is only one aspect of their identity. Many secular Jews practice certain aspects of the religion, such as having a Passover Seder or fasting during Yom Kippur. It would not be uncommon to see a secular family to light Shabbat candles, say the blessings over food and wine, have a Shabbat dinner together, and then for the parents to get into their car and drive their children to the movies.

Traditional
Masorti/Traditional Jews make up 30.5% of the Jewish population in Israel. Many of these "traditional Jews" differ from the Orthodox only because they will drive their cars on the Sabbath, use electricity, watch television, or go to a soccer game or the beach, frequently after attending religious services in the morning and the evening before. What is critical is that all are committed to a major religious component in the definition of their Jewishness and the Jewishness of the Jewish state.  Traditional Jews make up many of the Likud political party.

Orthodox
27.9% of the Jewish population identifies as Orthodox ("dati") or "ultra-Orthodox" ("Haredi"). Most of the Orthodox, and some ultra-Orthodox, believe that secular Zionism and Judaism can successfully work and live together in Israel. Politically, they align with National Religious Party, the Morasha Party, and by the two state-appointed Chief Rabbis. Orthodox Jews are often seen wearing knitted yarmulkes. The ultra-Orthodox (Charedim) represent 13% of Jews living in Israel. The Charedim tend to live in their own communities, and live according to Jewish law by following moral and dress codes passed down from ancestors. This part of the population is seen wearing black hats and black yarmulkes, and some Hasidic groups are related to Hasidic groups in the United States.

Discrimination issues

Housing
As of November 2012, secular and Orthodox Jews are competing in a bidding war for apartments in Harish after a court ruled that the Israel Land Administration could not discriminate between them. Elsewhere, officials in Jerusalem City Hall have alleged that the Ministry of Housing worked with ILA to favor housing for Chareidim in the Ramot area of Jerusalem.

Public access
The Association for Civil Rights in Israel has called upon the mayor of Modi'in to revoke a residents-only restriction to Anaba Park during the High Holidays and summer vacation, deeming it a discrimination against Haredim in the neighboring town of Modi'in Illit. The Jewish Telegraphic Agency reports that this municipality of about 80,000 is predominately secular. The regulation was seen as a response to threats from Hareidim to bar secular visitors from a heritage site in Modi'in Illit.

Membership in the United Nations
In 1949, Israel became part of the United Nations. When a state becomes part of the United Nations, the state adopts the Universal Declaration of Human Rights. In the Declaration, there are many instances that reflect a country's need for religious freedom. The Preamble of the Declaration states that it is "a common standard of achievement for all peoples and all nations". In the Declaration, both articles 2 and 18 reference freedom of religion. In article 2, it states that everyone is entitled to all the rights, without any distinction such as religion. Article 18 states that everyone has the right to freedom of thought, conscience, and religion, and has the right to show their religion in teaching, practice, worship, and observance.

Non-Jews in Israel
In Israel, to be considered halachically Jewish by the rabbinate, a person should have a Jewish mother or convert to Judaism in orthodox conversion. There  are portion of the immigrant population that moved to Israel from the former Soviet Union and many parts of Europe, and identify as Jewish even though they did not have a Jewish mother. This part of the population accounts for around 320,000 people, who serve in the Israeli Defense Forces and celebrate Jewish holidays.

Israel legally recognizes thirteen non-Jewish religious communities, each of which practice their own religious family law. The largest religious minority population is the Muslim community of Israel, and it amounts to 17.3% of the overall population. The Muslim communities live mostly in the northern part of the country. The Orthodox Jewish and the Sunni Muslim population have the highest population growth of all communities in Israel. They are free under the law to vote, practice religion, be members of the Israeli parliament, and can use the same Israeli education system as the rest of the country, although the education system is de facto mostly bifurcated into Jewish and non-Jewish schools (see Education in Israel). Many Arabs are a part of the Israeli government and politics. Almost one 10th of the parliament are Arab, and there is a mosque in the parliament building (Knesset) for those who are Muslim. A Supreme Court justice and a minister of the Israeli cabinet are also Arab Muslims. Muslims, as well as most other religious minorities, are not required to serve in the army.

The next-largest minority population is the Christian population (2%), some of whom live with Jewish communities. The Christian population in Israel is the only Christian population in the Middle East that has grown in the last half century. Christians choose to live in Israel because they have freedom of speech and the freedom to practice religion.

References

External links
 Yishai Blank, In Search of the Secular. In: Institutionalizing Rights and Religion: Competing Supremacies. Cambridge University Press, 2017.

 
Israel
Society of Israel
Israel